Alberto Gallego Ruiz (born 25 November 1990 in Don Benito) is a Spanish former cyclist, who competed as a professional from 2014 to 2016 and again from 2020 to 2022.

Between January 2016 and October 2019, Gallego served a suspension after a positive drugs test for stanozolol, an androgen and anabolic steroid.

Major results

2014
 1st  Mountains classification Troféu Joaquim Agostinho
2015
 3rd Overall Vuelta a la Comunidad de Madrid
 3rd Overall Troféu Joaquim Agostinho
 7th Overall Volta ao Alentejo
 7th Overall Route du Sud
 8th Overall Vuelta a Asturias

References

External links

1990 births
Living people
Spanish male cyclists
People from Don Benito
Sportspeople from the Province of Badajoz
Cyclists from Extremadura